Elections to Mid and East Antrim District Council, part of the Northern Ireland local elections on 2 May 2019, returned 40 members to the council using Single Transferable Vote. The Democratic Unionist Party were the largest party in both first-preference votes and seats.

Election results

Note: "Votes" are the first preference votes.

The overall turnout was 47.58% with a total of 46,827 valid votes cast. A total of 556 ballots were rejected.

Districts summary

|- class="unsortable" align="centre"
!rowspan=2 align="left"|Ward
! % 
!Cllrs
! %
!Cllrs
! %
!Cllrs
! %
!Cllrs
! %
!Cllrs
! % 
!Cllrs
! %
!Cllrs
!rowspan=2|TotalCllrs
|- class="unsortable" align="center"
!colspan=2 bgcolor="" | DUP
!colspan=2 bgcolor="" | UUP
!colspan=2 bgcolor="" | Alliance
!colspan=2 bgcolor="" | TUV
!colspan=2 bgcolor="" | Sinn Féin
!colspan=2 bgcolor=""| SDLP
!colspan=2 bgcolor="white"| Others
|-
|align="left"|Ballymena
|bgcolor="#D46A4C"|27.6
|bgcolor="#D46A4C"|2
|7.0
|0
|8.3
|1
|15.1
|1
|7.5
|0
|12.2
|1
|22.4
|2
|7
|-
|align="left"|Bannside
|27.0
|2
|15.3
|1
|9.3
|0
|bgcolor="#D1E5FA"|36.4
|bgcolor="#D1E5FA"|2
|12.0
|1
|0.0
|0
|0.0
|0
|6
|-
|align="left"|Braid
|bgcolor="#D46A4C"|37.7
|bgcolor="#D46A4C"|3
|21.3
|1
|8.0
|1
|20.1
|2
|7.1
|0
|0.0
|0
|5.8
|0
|7
|-
|align="left"|Carrick Castle
|bgcolor="#D46A4C"|35.8
|bgcolor="#D46A4C"|2
|22.3
|2
|21.4
|1
|0.0
|0
|0.0
|0
|0.0
|0
|20.5
|0
|5
|-
|align="left"|Coast Road
|bgcolor="#D46A4C"|30.9
|bgcolor="#D46A4C"|2
|13.0
|1
|21.7
|1
|10.7
|0
|15.5
|1
|0.0
|0
|8.2
|0
|5
|-
|align="left"|Knockagh
|bgcolor="#D46A4C"|31.8
|bgcolor="#D46A4C"|2
|24.7
|1
|20.6
|1
|5.8
|0
|0.0
|0
|0.0
|0
|17.2
|1
|5
|-
|align="left"|Larne Lough
|bgcolor="#D46A4C"|32.9
|bgcolor="#D46A4C"|2
|25.8
|1
|29.7
|2
|7.3
|0
|0.0
|0
|0.0
|0
|4.3
|0
|5
|-
|- class="unsortable" class="sortbottom" style="background:#C9C9C9"
|align="left"| Total
|32.0
|15
|18.2
|7
|15.8
|7
|15.2
|5
|6.4
|2
|1.8
|1
|10.4
|3
|40
|-
|}

District results

Ballymena

2014: 3 x DUP, 1 x Independent, 1 x SDLP, 1 x TUV, 1 x UUP
2019: 2 x DUP, 2 x Independent, 1 x SDLP, 1 x TUV, 1 x Alliance
2014-2019 Change: Alliance and Independent gain from DUP and UUP

Bannside

2014: 2 x TUV, 2 x DUP, 1 x UUP, 1 x Sinn Féin
2019: 2 x TUV, 2 x DUP, 1 x UUP, 1 x Sinn Féin
2014-2019 Change: No change

Braid

2014: 4 x DUP, 1 x TUV, 1 x UUP, 1 x Sinn Féin
2019: 3 x DUP, 2 x TUV, 1 x UUP, 1 x Alliance
2014-2019 Change: TUV and Alliance gain from DUP and Sinn Féin

Carrick Castle

2014: 2 x DUP, 1 x UUP, 1 x UKIP, 1 x Independent
2019: 2 x DUP, 2 x UUP, 1 x Alliance
2014-2019 Change: UUP and Alliance gain from Independent and UKIP

Coast Road

2014: 1 x UUP, 1 x Sinn Féin, 1 x Alliance, 1 x DUP, 1 x TUV
2019: 2 x DUP, 1 x Alliance, 1 x Sinn Féin, 1 x UUP
2014-2019 Change: DUP gain from TUV

Knockagh

2014: 2 x DUP, 2 x UUP, 1 x Alliance
2019: 2 x DUP, 1 x UUP, 1 x Alliance, 1 x Independent
2014-2019 Change: Independent gain from UUP

Larne Lough

2014: 2 x DUP, 2 x UUP, 1 x Alliance
2019: 2 x DUP, 2 x Alliance, 1 x UUP
2014-2019 Change: Alliance gain from UUP

Changes during the term

† Co-options

‡ Changes in affiliation

– Suspensions
Marc Collins (DUP) was suspended from the council for eight months from Friday 24 June 2022.

John Carson (DUP) was suspended from the council for three months from Monday 10 October 2022.

Last updated 12 October 2022.

Current composition: see Mid and East Antrim District Council

References

2019 Northern Ireland local elections
21st century in County Antrim
Elections in County Antrim